Andrew Strijk (born 18 October 1987) is an Australian rules footballer currently listed with the West Perth Football Club in the West Australian Football League (WAFL). He previously played with the West Coast Eagles in the Australian Football League (AFL).

Career
Strijk was recruited from the Carine Junior Football Club, and made his debut at the age of 18 for West Perth midway through the 2006 WAFL season, against . He played 11 games in his debut season, scoring 12 goals. One of West Perth's most consistently selected players, he played state football for Western Australia in 2009 and 2010, whilst also working part-time as a refrigeration mechanic.

Strijk impressed West Coast recruiting staff with his clean kicking skills in the midfield and off the half-back line, marking skills and his ability to score goals, and was selected by them with Pick 27 in the 2010 AFL Rookie Draft. He missed most of the preseason through injury but again due to his consistent performances at West Perth, was elevated off the rookie list to make his debut in Round 13 against the Western Bulldogs. He performed well, scoring two goals on debut and playing the next five games mainly off the half-forward and half-back flanks, scoring five more goals. In total, he played 13 games for the club between 2010 and 2012, kicking 11 goals. At the end of the 2012 season he was told that his contract with the Eagles would not be renewed for 2013.

In 2018 Strijk won the Bernie Naylor Medal as the leading goalkicker in the WAFL, shared with his Falcons teammate Tyler Keitel.

References

External links
Andrew Strijk player profile page at WAFL FootyFacts

1987 births
Living people
West Coast Eagles players
West Perth Football Club players
Australian rules footballers from Perth, Western Australia